Jennette B. Bradley (born October 2, 1952) is an American politician of the Republican party and served as the 62nd lieutenant governor of Ohio from 2003 to 2005 and Ohio State Treasurer from 2005 to 2007. Bradley was the first African American elected to statewide office in Ohio.

Early life and education
Bradley was born in Columbus, Ohio. Her family settled in a neighborhood on Columbus' east side after her father retired from the United States Army. After graduating from East High School in 1970, Bradley attended Wittenberg University in Springfield, Ohio and earned a degree in psychology.

Early professional career
Bradley took a job with the Columbus Metropolitan Housing Authority. She became the first black woman to serve as the executive director of the Authority when she was 28 years old.  In 1986, Bradley moved to Washington, D.C. She returned to Columbus in 1989 and worked as a senior executive for Huntington National Bank.

Columbus City Council
Bradley entered the 1991 Columbus City Council race as a Republican candidate. She was reelected in 1995 and 1999. During her tenure she was chair of City Council's Recreation and Parks and Public Utilities committees. She resigned from the council when she became Lieutenant Governor in 2003.

Lieutenant governor
In 2002 Governor Bob Taft announced he had chosen Bradley to replace Maureen O'Connor as his running mate. Many conservatives did not support Bradley because she was pro-choice. Critics of the Taft-Bradley ticket were also concerned about her City Council vote to extend city workers' health care benefits to include domestic partners and same-sex couples. Bradley was then criticized for having later voted against this legislation.

Taft and Bradley won the race with approximately 58% of the vote. Bradley became the third female lieutenant governor of Ohio and the first African-American woman elected to the office. She also became the first black female lieutenant governor of any U.S. state.

After taking office, Bradley was appointed by Taft to head the Ohio Department of Commerce, the Clean Ohio Council, and the Ohio Housing Finance Agency. In 2004, the governor also appointed Bradley to the "Jobs Cabinet."  Following the resignation of Joseph T. Deters as state treasurer, Taft appointed Bradley to the post, effective January 2005. She resigned as lieutenant governor before taking her new post   However, Bradley was defeated by conservative Tea Party-backed Ashtabula County Auditor Sandra O'Brien in the May 2006 Republican primary election.

Further career 
In 2016, Bradley was among the 9 people chosen from over 100 candidates to serve on a committee to review the charter of the Columbus City Council.

See also
 List of female lieutenant governors in the United States
 List of minority governors and lieutenant governors in the United States

References

External links
 

State treasurers of Ohio
Lieutenant Governors of Ohio
State cabinet secretaries of Ohio
African-American people in Ohio politics
African-American women in politics
Wittenberg University alumni
Women in Ohio politics
Living people
1952 births
Ohio Republicans
Columbus City Council members
Women city councillors in Ohio
21st-century African-American people
21st-century African-American women
20th-century African-American people
20th-century African-American women
Black conservatism in the United States